Psecadius is a genus of beetles in the family Carabidae, containing the following species:

 Psecadius alluaudi (Vuillet, 1911)
 Psecadius eustalactus (Gerstaecker, 1866)
 Psecadius eximius (Sommer, 1852)
 Psecadius obertheuri (Gestro, 1895)

References

Panagaeinae